St. Thomas Aquinas Cemetery (also known as Cimetière Saint-Thomas-d'Aquinis) is a cemetery located in Compton, Quebec. It is most notable for being the burial place of Canadian Prime Minister Louis St. Laurent (1882–1973).

Established in the 1850s, the cemetery is the resting place for a few of St. Laurent family including the Prime Minister's daughter Madeleine St. Laurent.

See also
 St-Rémi-de-Napierville Cemetery, burial place of Pierre Trudeau in St-Rémi-de-Napierville, Quebec
 Maclaren Cemetery, burial place of Lester Pearson

References

External links
 Saint Thomas Aquinas Cemetery, Compton, Compton County, Quebec information at interment.net
 

Cemeteries in Quebec
Roman Catholic cemeteries in Canada